Gavin Phillip Short (born 1962) is a Falkland Islands politician who served as a Member of the Legislative Assembly for the Stanley constituency from 2009 until 2017. He was previously a Member of the Legislative Council from 1989–1993.

 Short works for Cable & Wireless and is the Chairman of the General Employees' Union. He is a former member of the Falkland Islands Defence Force and a volunteer fireman.

In November 2009 he was elected to the Legislative Assembly for Stanley, and in June 2010 he represented the Falklands at the annual meeting of the UN Special Committee on Decolonisation in New York City.

Short won re-election in 2013, but lost his seat at the 2017 general election. In 2018 he joined the Falkland Islands Radio Service as a Senior News Correspondent.

References

1962 births
Living people
Falkland Islands Councillors 1989–1993
Falkland Islands MLAs 2009–2013
Falkland Islands MLAs 2013–2017
Falkland Islands MLAs 2021–2025